Joseph William Chinn (November 16, 1798 – December 5, 1840) was a Virginia lawyer, plantation owner and politician who served in both houses of the Virginia General Assembly and in the United States House of Representatives.

Early and family life
Born at "Epping Forest" near Nuttsville, Lancaster County, Virginia, the home of his maternal grandfather Col. Joseph Ball (also a maternal grandfather to George Washington). His father, also Joseph Chinn, had married Elizabeth Griffin, one of Col. Ball's daughters, and represented Lancaster County in the Virginia House of Delegates alongside Henry Towles from 1792 until 1794, when he was elected to the Virginia Senate to represent the Northern Neck counties of Lancaster, Richmond and Northumberland. His paternal grandfather, yet another Joseph Chinn, had served in Virginia's House of Burgesses, representing Lancaster County from 1748 until 1750 (like Col. Ball's grandfather of the same name), when he won election as Lancaster County's coroner and later served as its sheriff.

This Joseph Chinn received a private education locally, then traveled to Schenectady, New York to continue his education, graduating from Union College in 1819. Upon returning to Virginia, Chinn studied law at the newly opened proprietary Needham Law School run by Judge Creed Taylor in Needham, Virginia.

He married Mary Ann Smith (1802–1865), daughter of Charles Smith of Morattico Hall, who bore a son, also Joseph William Chinn (1836-1908) who inherited the plantation and fought for the Confederacy during the American Civil War, then became a lawyer and fathered Virginia Supreme Court justice Joseph W. Chinn (1866-1936).

Career

Admitted to the Virginia bar in 1821, this Joseph W. Chinn began his legal practice on Virginia's Northern Neck. He also owned land and eventually farmed using enslaved labor. In 1820, his plantation near Stafford, Virginia included 10 persons and no slaves. In 1830, his family in Lancaster County, Virginia included four white persons and 13 slaves.

Chinn continued his families' political tradition. Lancaster County voters first elected him to the Virginia House of Delegates in 1826 and re-elected him once. Lancaster County voters also joined others from northern Virginia to elect Chinn to the Virginia Senate, where he served from 1829 until 1831, when he resigned because he had been elected to the United States House of Representatives.

A Jacksonian Democrat, Chinn defeated anti-Jacksonian congressman John Taliaferro in 1830 and representing Virginia's 13th congressional district. He won re-election despite being to redistricted Virginia's 10th congressional district. However, in 1834, Chinn lost his second re-election bid to Taliaferro (who would later win re-election as a Whig). During his second term, Chinn was chairman of the Committee on the District of Columbia (1833 to 1835). Afterwards, he moved to Richmond County, Virginia where he resumed practicing law and operating his plantation.

Death and legacy

Chinn died at his estate called "Wilna" near Farnham, Virginia on December 5, 1840 and was interred in the family cemetery on the Wilna property. His widow and young son Joseph Chinn moved to Tappahannock, Essex County, Virginia where they lived with the family of merchant Robert Hopkins. By 1860 the boy had reached legal age, claimed his inheritance and married, living with his wife Gabriella in Richmond County. He would leave the University of Virginia in July, 1861, enlist as a private in the 40th Virginia Infantry and become the regimental sergeant major in 1862 before transferring to the 9th Virginia Cavalry. He survived the American Civil War and received a presidential pardon after only mentioning his clerical service on September 9, 1865. Eventually, his son (this Joseph W. Chinn's grandson), yet another Joseph William Chinn continued the family's legal tradition and later became a justice of the Virginia Supreme Court. The family's Richmond County home, Wilna, remains a private home. The Chinn family left Wilna in 1890 to relocate to Sunnyside Plantation in nearby Warsaw.

Although several generations of this Chinn family achieved political office, descendants continued prominent on the Northern Neck, and this Joseph Chinn for a time represented Prince William County (and adjoining areas), the historical marker in Prince William County near Minnieville and Old Bridge Roads, as well as the 98-acre Chinn Regional Park, Chinn Regional Library and Chinn Aquatic Center remember the legacy of an early and distinguished African-American family descended from the 19th century emancipated slaves Thomas Chinn and his wife Nancy (who bought 500 acres between Telegraph and Davis Ford Roads at the end of the American Civil War), and their daughter Mary Jane Chinn (1827-1907), who became the family's matriarch.

References

External links

1798 births
1840 deaths
Members of the Virginia House of Delegates
Virginia state senators
Virginia lawyers
Union College (New York) alumni
People from Lancaster County, Virginia
Jacksonian members of the United States House of Representatives from Virginia
19th-century American politicians